Four Lane Ends is a road junction in Thornton-Cleveleys, Lancashire, England. It is formed by the meeting of the north–south-running Fleetwood Road and the east–west-bound Victoria Road (formerly known as Ramper Road), the B5412. The names of both roads change in line with their directions at the junction, with Fleetwood Road North (leading to and from Fleetwood) becoming Fleetwood Road South (leading to and from the Norcross Roundabout primarily) and Victoria Road East (leading to and from Thornton Centre) becomes Victoria Road West (leading to and from Cleveleys).

At the northeastern corner, accessed from Fleetwood Road North, stands the Rushlands, a former doctor's home and retirement home, built around 1928. It is now a hotel.

A former NatWest Bank building stands in the southeastern corner. It replaced Swarbricks Farm.

The Grade II listed Thornton-Cleveleys War Memorial, erected in 1923, stands at southwestern corner of the junction.

Thornton's public library (opened in 1938) and Thornton Little Theatre (formerly Thornton Lecture Hall) occupies the northwestern corner.

References

Sources 

 
 

Transport in Lancashire
Road junctions in England
The Fylde